Team China Superleague Formula team is a national racing team from China, similar to the A1 Team China which competed in A1 Grand Prix between 2005 and 2009. The car will compete in Superleague Formula for the two Chinese races in October of the 2010 season. Although not strictly associated with a football club, it was the first of many cars to dissociate with the football club branding. It will be operated by Atech GP/Reid Motorsport for the Ordos and Beijing rounds, driven by home-racer Qinghua Ma.

Record
(key)

2010

References

National sports teams of China
Superleague Formula club teams